Marketplace is an American radio program that focuses on business, the economy, and events that influence them. The program was first broadcast in 1989. Hosted by Kai Ryssdal since 2005, the show is produced and distributed by American Public Media. Marketplace is produced in Los Angeles with bureaus in New York, Washington, D.C., Portland, Baltimore, London, and Shanghai. It won a Peabody Award in 2000.

Besides the flagship daytime half-hour program, Marketplace also produces a companion show, the seven-and-a-half-minute-long Marketplace Morning Report, hosted by David Brancaccio, which airs on many public radio stations during the last segment of the NPR program Morning Edition.  They also formerly produced a weekend version called Marketplace Weekend (formerly Marketplace Money and Sound Money).  The Marketplace team produces a number of podcasts, including Make Me Smart, This Is Uncomfortable, The Uncertain Hour, How We Survive, and Million Bazillion, as well as podcast versions of the radio broadcast and extended podcasts built around regular segments from the radio show.

History
Marketplace was founded in 1989 by James Russell in Long Beach, California. It was initially affiliated with KLON-FM at Cal State—Long Beach and distributed by American Public Radio, later renamed Public Radio International. The show nearly ran out of funding its first year, which Russell described, saying, "We were within three days of laying off our small staff and closing down." The program survived through the help of the University of Southern California (USC), which acquired the show, and later, in 1990, with the underwriting of General Electric. USC became the only university in the U.S. at the time to produce a daily news program distributed nationally.

In 2000, Minnesota Public Radio (MPR) acquired Marketplace Productions from USC. This acquisition was the subject of a lawsuit by Public Radio International, which said it had not given its contractually required approval for the sale. 

In 2004, American Public Media was founded as the production and distribution arm of MPR, and is currently the producer and distributor of Marketplace.

Demographics
As of 2014, Marketplaces programs reached upwards of 12 million listeners with an average income of $101,000.

Companion programs 
A sister program, the Marketplace Morning Report, offers seven unique seven-minute, thirty-second morning broadcasts that replace the business news-oriented "E" segment of NPR's Morning Edition on many public radio stations. Since September 2014, Marketplace Morning Report has been incorporated into Morning Edition as a segment in the latter program's second hour. The Marketplace brand also took over the money advice program Sound Money, which was renamed Marketplace Money in 2005, with content oriented toward a personal finance theme. The three shows share reporters and editorial staff. Marketplace Money was replaced with Marketplace Weekend in June 2014. Marketplace Weekend was cancelled in 2018.

Podcasts
All three radio programs, Marketplace, Marketplace Morning Report, and Marketplace Minute (with Westwood One) are made available as free podcasts. In 2015, Marketplace began to offer non-broadcast-only podcasts: Actuality (2015—2016 with Quartz (publication)), Codebreaker, and Corner Office. In 2016, The Uncertain Hour and Make Me Smart  were added. 

Marketplace currently produces the following podcasts: Make Me Smart, hosted by Kimberly Adams and Kai Ryssdal, The Uncertain Hour, hosted by Krissy Clark, This Is Uncomfortable, hosted by Reema Khrais Million Bazillion, hosted by Bridget Bodnar and Ryan Perez, and How We Survive.

Awards
Marketplace has been the recipient of multiple awards, including:

 Emmy (2013): Big Sky, Big Money
 Edward R. Murrow Prize (2012): The Chinese Student Syndrome
 National Headliner Award (2007): Labor Shortage
 Peabody Award (2000): Radio

Staff

Hosts
 Kai Ryssdal – Marketplace, Corner Office, Make Me Smart
 David Brancaccio – Marketplace Morning Report 
 Kimberly Adams  – Make Me Smart
 Krissy Clark – The Uncertain Hour
 Victoria Craig – Marketplace Morning Report from the BBC World Service
 Reema Khrais – This Is Uncomfortable

Contributors
 Stephen Beard – Bureau Chief, London 
 Nancy Marshall-Genzer – Senior Reporter, Washington
 Amy Scott – Correspondent, Baltimore
 Jennifer Pak, Correspondent, Shanghai
 Krissy Clark – Wealth and Poverty Senior Correspondent, Los Angeles
 Andy Uhler – Reporter, Dallas
 Mitchel Hartman – Correspondent, Portland
 Sabri Ben-Achour – Reporter, New York
Meghan McCarty Carino – Workplace Culture Reporter, New York

Former lead anchors
 David Brown (2003–2005)
 David Brancaccio (1993–2003)
 Jim Angle (1990–1993)
Michael Creedman (1989–1990)

References

External links 
 

1989 radio programme debuts
American Public Media programs
Audio podcasts
Business and finance podcasts
Peabody Award-winning radio programs
University of Southern California